The 2018 William & Mary Tribe football team represented the College of William & Mary as a member of the Colonial Athletic Association (CAA) in the 2018 NCAA Division I FCS football season. The Tribe, led by 39th-year head coach Jimmye Laycock, played their home games at Zable Stadium. They finished the season 4–6 overall and 3–4 in CAA play to place eighth.

On August 5, 2018, Laycock announced that he would be retiring after the conclusion of the 2018 season. He finished at William & Mary with a 39-year record of 249–194–2.

Previous season
The Tribe finished the 2017 season 2–9, 0–8 in CAA play to finish in last place. It was the first time since the 1956 season that the Tribe failed to win a single conference game.

Preseason

CAA Poll
In the CAA preseason poll released on July 24, 2018, the Tribe were predicted to finish in eleventh place. They did not have any players selected to the preseason all-CAA team.

Schedule

Game summaries

at Bucknell

at Virginia Tech

at James Madison

Colgate

Albany

at Towson

Maine

at Rhode Island

at Villanova

Richmond

References

William and Mary Tribe
William & Mary Tribe football seasons
William and Mary Tribe football